Mingona Township is a township in Barber County, Kansas, United States.  As of the 2000 census, its population was 57.

Geography

The stream of Bitter Creek runs through this township.

References
 USGS Geographic Names Information System (GNIS)

External links
 City-Data.com

Townships in Barber County, Kansas
Townships in Kansas